The Bishop of Carlisle is the Ordinary of the Church of England Diocese of Carlisle in the Province of York.

The diocese covers the county of Cumbria except for Alston Moor and the former Sedbergh Rural District.  The see is in the city of Carlisle where the seat is located at the Cathedral Church of the Holy and Undivided Trinity which was a collegiate church until elevated to cathedral status in 1133.

The diocese was created in 1133 by Henry I out of part of the Diocese of Durham. It was extended in 1856 taking over part of the Diocese of Chester. The residence of the bishop was Rose Castle, Dalston, until 2009; the current bishop is the first to reside in the new Bishop's House, Keswick.

The current bishop is James Newcome, the 67th Bishop of Carlisle, who signs James Carliol and was enthroned on 10 October 2009.

History

Early times
The original territory of the diocese first became a political unit in the reign of King William Rufus (1087–1100), who made it into the Earldom of Carlisle, which covered most of the counties of Cumberland and Westmorland. In 1133, during the reign of his successor, Henry I, a diocese was erected in the territory of the earldom, the territory being subtracted from the Diocese of Durham. This happened despite there being locally a strong Celtic element that looked to Glasgow for episcopal administration. As the first bishop, the king secured the appointment of his former confessor, Æthelwulf (1133–1155), an Englishman, Prior of the Augustinian Canons, whom he had established at Carlisle in 1102, though at the time of his consecration Æthelwulf seems to have been Prior of the Augustinian house at Nostell in Yorkshire. An efficient administrator, he ruled the diocese until his death in 1156 and succeeded in imparting a certain vigour to diocesan life. Among other initiatives, he built a moderate-sized Norman minster of which the transepts and part of the nave still exist. To serve this cathedral he introduced his own Augustinian brethren, with the result that Carlisle was the only see in England with an Augustinian cathedral chapter, the other monastic cathedral chapters in England consisting of Benedictine monks. There was only one archdeaconry, that of Carlisle.

Of the next bishop, Bernard, little is known, and after his death, in or about 1186, there was a long vacancy, during which the diocese was administered by another Bernard, Archbishop of Ragusa. During this period Carlisle suffered severely from the incursions of the Scots, and early in the reign of Henry III the king complained to the Pope that Carlisle had revolted in favour of Scotland, and that the canons had elected a bishop for themselves. The reigning papal legate, Philip of Dreux, punished this action by exiling the canons and appointing Hugh, Abbot of Beaulieu, a good administrator, as bishop.

It was important to the English government to have a reliable prelate at Carlisle, as they constantly looked to the bishop to attend to Scottish affairs, negotiate treaties, and generally play the part of diplomat. The next bishop was Walter Malclerk, formerly agent of King John, and a prominent figure in the reign of Henry III. Always a patron of the Friars Preachers, he introduced both Dominicans and Franciscans into the city and diocese. He resigned his see in 1246 in order to join the Order of St. Dominic. About this time a new choir was begun and carried to completion, only to be destroyed in the great fire of 1292.

A fresh beginning was made by the energetic Bishop John de Halton (1292–1324), a favourite of Edward I, and for nearly a hundred years the building of the present choir proceeded, though with many interruptions. Its chief glory is the great East window, remarkable both for its own beauty and as marking a transition from the earlier style to the perfection of tracery. During this time the see was governed by a line of bishops, busy and useful diplomats in their day, but not remarkable in other respects. Bishop John Kirkby took an active role in Border military actions, defeating a Scottish raid in 1345 and commanding English troops at the battle of Neville's Cross in the following year. Thomas Merke was a close friend of Richard II, who was later tried for high treason under Henry IV and deprived. The subsequent bishops were scholars, frequently employed in negotiating truces and treaties with Scotland, and several of them were Chancellors of Oxford or of Cambridge University.

Tudor Period

Among this generation of scholar diplomats was Cardinal Thomas Wolsey's friend, John Kite (1521–1537), who remained faithful to his master, and who supported him in the poverty of his latter days.

The last of the bishops in communion with Rome was Owen Oglethorpe, a kindly-tempered man who was prevailed on to crown Elizabeth when no other bishop could be found to do it. This was an act he afterwards much regretted. On Christmas Day after the Queen’s accession he disobeyed the note she sent him in the Chapel Royal forbidding him to elevate the Sacred Host in her presence. His refusal to take the Oath of Supremacy led to his being deprived of his title along with the other bishops, and he died a prisoner 31 December 1559. Under Owen Ogelthorp Carlisle was a poor diocese, and when the Reformers plundered the churches they found little but a chalice in each, and even of these some were of tin.

After Ogelthorp's deprivation and death, Bernard Gilpin was to succeed him in Carlisle but he refused though much pressed to it, the Bishopric was conferred on one John Best, who was consecrated 2 March 1560. Bishop John Best was the first post-Marian Anglican Bishop at Carlisle.  Bishop Best was the 31st Bishop of Carlisle from 2 May 1561 to his death on 22 May 1570.

Subsequent Centuries

The cathedral, originally dedicated to the Blessed Virgin, received its current dedication at the time of the Reformation.

The diocese was extended in 1856 by the addition of part of the Diocese of Chester.

List of bishops

Assistant bishops
Among those who served as assistant bishops of the diocese were:
1931–1938: Logie Danson, Canon Residentiary of Carlisle Cathedral and former Bishop of Labuan and Sarawak; later Bishop of Edinburgh

Honorary assistant bishops — retired bishops taking on occasional duties voluntarily — have included:
1997–2021: Alec Graham, retired Bishop of Newcastle

References
Notes

Bibliography

 
 Bishops of Carlisle: 1133-1324. British History Online
 Bishops of Carlisle: 1292-1556. British History Online
 Bishops of Carlisle: 1537-1860. British History Online
Haydn's Book of Dignities (1894) Joseph Haydn/Horace Ockerby, reprinted 1969Whitaker's Almanack 1883 to 2004 Joseph Whitaker & Sons Ltd/A&C Black, London
Crockfords 1858 to 2003/4 Church Commissioners
The above text is in part adapted freely from the Catholic Encyclopedia, 1908.

External links
 Crockford's Clerical Directory - Listings
Friends of Rose Castle Website

 
Carlisle
Bishops of Carlisle